Halecania is a genus of fungi in the family Leprocaulaceae. It has 22 species. The genus was circumscribed by Austrian lichenologist Michaela Mayrhofer in 1987, with Halecania alpivaga assigned as the type species. She created Halecania to contain species, formerly placed in Lecania, with the following characteristics:  uniformly amyloid apical domes, paraphyses with dark brown apical caps, and halonate ascospores (i.e., surrounded by a transparent coat).

Species
Halecania alpivaga 
Halecania athallina  – Alaska
Halecania australis 
Halecania bryophila 
Halecania elaeiza 
Halecania etayoana 
Halecania fuscopannariae 
Halecania giraltiae 
Halecania laevis 
Halecania lecanorina 
Halecania lobulata 
Halecania micacea 
Halecania pakistanica 
Halecania panamensis  – Panama
Halecania pannarica 
Halecania parasitica 
Halecania pepegospora 
Halecania ralfsii 
Halecania rhypodiza 
Halecania robertcurtisii   – eastern North America
Halecania santessonii  – Russia
Halecania spodomela 
Halecania subalpivaga 
Halecania subsquamosa 
Halecania tornensis 
Halecania viridescens

References

Lecanoromycetes
Lecanoromycetes genera
Lichen genera
Taxa described in 1987